Kaynat Hafeez (born 17 June 1996) is a Pakistani cricketer who plays as a right-handed batter and right-arm off break bowler. In November 2019, she was named in Pakistan's squads for their series against England in Malaysia. She made her Women's One Day International (WODI) for Pakistan, against England, on 14 December 2019.

In June 2021, she was named in Pakistan's squad for their series against the West Indies.

She has played domestic cricket for Lahore, Higher Education Commission and State Bank of Pakistan.

References

External links
 
 

1996 births
Living people
Cricketers from Lahore
Pakistani women cricketers
Pakistan women One Day International cricketers
Lahore women cricketers
Higher Education Commission women cricketers
State Bank of Pakistan women cricketers